Muriel Ressiguier (born 21 December 1977) is a French politician formerly of La France Insoumise. She was elected to the French National Assembly on 18 June 2017, representing the department of Hérault. Ressiguier was the Member of Parliament for Hérault's 2nd constituency.

Ressiguier began her political career as an anti-Gulf War activist. In September 2020, she joined the Ensemble! group. Disillusioned with NUPES, Ressiguier ran in the 2022 French legislative election as a miscellaneous left candidate. She was eliminated in the first round, coming in fifth place, losing her seat to the new candidate La France Insoumise Nathalie Oziol.

See also

 List of deputies of the 15th National Assembly of France

References

1977 births
Living people
Deputies of the 15th National Assembly of the French Fifth Republic
La France Insoumise politicians
Left Party (France) politicians
Women members of the National Assembly (France)
21st-century French women politicians
Members of Parliament for Hérault